The Railway is one of the more famous novels by Hamid Ismailov. The book was originally written before he left Uzbekistan and was translated into English by Robert Chandler and published in 2006.  A Russian edition was published in Moscow in 1997 under the pseudonym Altaer Magdi.

Plot
The novel is plotted in Gilas, a fictitious small town on the ancient Silk Route in Uzbekistan. The heart of the novel and the town is a railway station, which sets the connection between the town and the greater world.  Gilas has people from all over - Armenians, Kurds, Persians, Ukrainians, Jews, Chechens, Koreans, gypsies, Russians etc and the novel tells the stories of some of them. The book describes the dramatic changes that was felt in the Central Asia in early twentieth century.

Characters
 Mefody-Jurisprudence -an alcoholic intellectual
 Father Loann -a Russian priest
 Kara-Musayev the younger-the chief of Police
 Umarali-Moneybags -an old moneylender

External links

References

Uzbekistani fiction
2006 novels
Novels set in Asia